São Lourenço may refer to several places:

Brazil
São Lourenço, Minas Gerais, a town in Brazil
, a neighborhood of the city of Niterói, Brazil
São Lourenço da Mata, Pernambuco
São Lourenço da Serra, São Paulo
São Lourenço do Oeste, Santa Catarina
São Lourenço do Piauí, Piauí
São Lourenço do Sul, Rio Grande do Sul

Portugal
, a parish in the municipality of Portalegre, Portugal
, a parish in the municipality of Setúbal, Portugal
São Lourenço, a village in the Parish of Pêra, Portugal

Other places
São Lourenço, Cape Verde, a village and cove in the island of Fogo, Cape Verde
São Lourenço (São Filipe), a parish on the island of Fogo, Cape Verde
São Lourenço, Macau, a parish in the territory of Macau

See also
 Saint Lawrence (c. 225–258), one of the seven deacons of ancient Rome